Wait for Me: The Best from Rebecca St. James is the first compilation album by Christian pop and rock artist Rebecca St. James.

Track listing

 Produced by Matt Bronleewe (1, 3, 5, 10, 12, 13, 15, & 16)
 Produced by Tedd T. (2, 4, 6-9, 14, & 18)
 Produced by Bill Deaton (11)
 Produced by John Hartley (17)

Reception
Allmusic gave the album 3 of 5 stars. John DeBiase at JesusFreak gave it 3.5 of 5 stars, naming the new track "I Thank You" as a "hit to be", but stating that "Expressions of your Love" would have benefited from less Tomlin and more St. James. He recommend the disc to new listeners of St. James as a "perfect introduction" to the singer. The album charted for 6 weeks among Billboard Magazine's Christian Albums rankings, peaking at No. 16.

The album's two singles, "Expressions of Your Love" and "I Thank You" both got major radio play in the US with the latter hitting No. 1. In the UK the songs, failed to chart on the Top 100 songs of 2004, but in Australia "Expressions of Your Love" hit No. 17 and "I Thank You" hit No. 20 on the Top 100 Songs of 2003.

For the year 2003, The Rock Across Australia (provider of weekly Australian Christian music charts) ranked "I Thank You" and "Expressions of Your Love" at No. 8 and No. 16 among Most Played Songs, No. 3 and No. 6 among most played songs by Australasian Artists, and No. 1 and No. 1 during 2 months and 1 month, respectively.

References

2003 greatest hits albums
ForeFront Records compilation albums
Rebecca St. James albums